Montheron Abbey is an historic monastery in Montheron near Lausanne in Switzerland. It was established by the Cistercians in 1045. The abbey was closed down in the 16th century and its abbey church used as a Reformed church after 1536. However, the architect William Fraisse redesigned the facade of the church in the Baroque architectural style in 1782.

See also

References

Cistercian monasteries in Switzerland
Baroque architecture in Switzerland
1045 establishments
Reformed church buildings in Switzerland
Monasteries dissolved under the Swiss Reformation
Protestant churches converted from Roman Catholicism